This is a list of the current members of the Senate of Colombia for the 2022–2026 legislative period. Their term runs from 20 July 2022 to 19 July 2026.

The 9th Congress of the Republic of Colombia represents the legislative branch of the Republic of Colombia, comprising the Senate and the Chamber of Representatives, which meet in the country's capital, Bogota. The Congress is composed of 108 senators and 187 representatives.

Article 144 of the Colombian Constitution of 1991 establishes the Congress to be the highest representative power in the Legislative body of the nation. According to this Article, the duties of this Congress include reforming the Constitution, writing and developing new laws, and enforcing political control upon the Government and its administration.

2022 Colombian parliamentary election

The most recent parliamentary elections in Colombia were held on 13 March 2022, where 289 members of the congress were elected.

Leadership

Senate of the Republic of Colombia

The elected 108 members of the Senate were distributed by party as per the following list. As per Organic Law 1921 of 2018, the runner-up for the final Presidential election is given an automatic seat into the Senate and its running mate into the Chamber of Representatives:

Party lists

See also
 List of presidents of Colombia
 List of vice presidents of Colombia

References

 
Colombia Senators
Senate